Clifford Sylvester Lewis (born November 9, 1959) is a former linebacker in the National Football League (NFL).

Biography
Lewis was born Clifford Sylvester Lewis on November 9, 1959, in Brewton, Alabama.

Career
Lewis was drafted by the Green Bay Packers in the twelfth round of the 1981 NFL Draft and played four seasons with the team. He played at the collegiate level at the University of Southern Mississippi.

See also
List of Green Bay Packers players

References

1959 births
Living people
People from Brewton, Alabama
Green Bay Packers players
American football linebackers
Southern Miss Golden Eagles football players